The 16th Meril Prothom Alo Awards ceremony, presented by Prothom Alo took place on 25 April 2014, at the Bangabandhu International Conference Center in Dhaka, Bangladesh as a part of 2013–14 film awards season. It organises cultural backgrounds sixteenth to reward stars. Visitors to the brim with the presence of a cover design of this program is the best awards of 14.

Facts and figures
This was 16th award ceremony of Meril Prothom Alo Awards. Mrittika Maya won the awards of best film category as well as Rakhal Sobuj was awarded for Critics Choice best actor for this film combinedly with Raisul Islam Asad. Purno Doirgho Prem Kahini was nominated for 5 awards including 2 Public Choice best actor – Shakib Khan and Arifin Shuvoo, Public Choice best actress, Public Choice best singer male and female and won three awards. Tahsan-Mithila couple was nominated for Public Choice best TV actor and actresses for Landphoner Dingulote Prem. Nusrat Imroz Tisha had two nominations in Public choice best film and TV actress and secured best TV actress for Jodi Bhalo Na Lage Dio Na Mon. Nazmun Munir Nancy got best singer award fifth time in a row from 2009 to 2013.

Winners and nominees 

14 awards were given in this ceremony and those are listed below:

Lifetime Achievement Award – 2014
 Nayok Raj Razzak

Public Choice Awards – 2013

Critics Choice Awards – 2013

Host and jury board
Jewel Aich was the main anchor of Meril Prothom Alo Awards 2014 and his helping hands were Shaju Khadem & Jannatul Ferdoush Peya. Jury Board for Critic's Choice Awards for best director, best actor and best actress were Anupam Hayat, Rokeya Prachy, Nadir Junaid and presided by film director Shahidul Islam Khokon and Critics Choice Awards for best director, best cinematography, best actor and best actress were Salauddin Lavlu, Tarana Halim, Ishrafil Shahin and presided by TV personality Ramendu Majumdar.

Presenters and performers

Presenters

Performers

See also
 National Film Award
 Ifad Film Club Award
 Babisas Award

References

2013
2013 film awards
2014 awards in Bangladesh
2014 in Dhaka
April 2014 events in Bangladesh